The Embassy of the State of Palestine in Qatar is the diplomatic mission of the Palestine in Qatar. It is located in Doha.

See also

List of diplomatic missions in Qatar.
List of diplomatic missions of Palestine.

References

Doha
Palestine
State of Palestine–Qatar relations